The Mannock Baronetcy, of Gifford's Hall near Stoke-by-Nayland in the County of Suffolk, was a title in the Baronetage of England.  It was created on 1 June 1627 for Francis Mannock.  The title became extinct on the death of the ninth Baronet in 1787.

Mannock baronets, of Gifford's Hall (1627)
Sir Francis Mannock, 1st Baronet (died 1634)
Sir Francis Mannock, 2nd Baronet (died 1687)
Sir William Mannock, 3rd Baronet (died 1714)
Sir Francis Mannock, 4th Baronet (1675–1758)
Sir William Mannock, 5th Baronet (died 1764)
Sir William Anthony Mannock, 6th Baronet (1759–1776)
Sir Francis Mannock, 7th Baronet (1710–1778)
Sir Thomas Mannock, 8th Baronet (died 1781)
Sir George Mannock, 9th Baronet (died 1787)

References

Extinct baronetcies in the Baronetage of England